Sergio Melta (born 16 March 1954), is a former Australian footballer, who had an extensive career in Australia's National Soccer League, spent entirely with Adelaide City.

Playing career

Club
Melta won the NSL's player of the year award in 1984.

International
Melta was given his international debut by Frank Arok but ultimately played just once for the Australian national team, a friendly against Czechoslovakia played at Hindmarsh Stadium in his home city of Adelaide in 1986. Melta was substituted off after 57 minutes during the 0–1  loss.

Coaching career
Melta took over the head coaching role of West Torrens Birkalla in the FFSA Premier League.  On 5 February 2013 he was appointed as assistant coach for A-League club Adelaide United. He is the current coach/manager of White City which competes in National Premier Leagues South Australia.

Career statistics

Club
Source:

International
Source:

Honours 
With Adelaide City:
 NSL Championship: 1986, 1991–92, 1993–94
 NSL Cup: 1977, 1989, 1991–92
Personal honours:
 NSL Player of the Year: 1984 with Adelaide City
 FFA Hall of Champions Inaugural inductee – 1999

References

External links 
 Oz Football profile

1954 births
Living people
Australian soccer players
Australia international soccer players
Adelaide City FC players
National Soccer League (Australia) players
Association football midfielders
FK Beograd (Australia) managers